is a Japanese department store chain owned by , a subsidiary of H2O Retailing Corporation.

Stores 
Hanshin Umeda
13-13, Umeda Itchome, Kita-ku, Osaka, Japan
Access
Hanshin Electric Railway Main Line: Umeda Station
JR West: Osaka Station and Kitashinchi Station
Osaka Municipal Subway
Midosuji Line: Umeda Station
Yotsubashi Line: Nishi-Umeda Station
Tanimachi Line: Higashi-Umeda Station

Others
Snack Park (スナックパーク) is in the first basement.
Hanshin Tigers Shop (阪神タイガースショップ) is in the 8th floor.

Hanshin Mikage
Mikage Classe, 2-1, Mikage-Nakamachi Sanchome, Higashinada-ku, Kōbe, Japan
Access: Hanshin Electric Railway Main Line: Mikage Station

Hanshin Nishinomiya
Ebista Nishinomiya in 1-26, Tanakacho, Nishinomiya, Hyōgo Prefecture, Japan
Access: Hanshin Electric Railway Main Line: Nishinomiya Station

Amagasaki Hanshin
Amagasaki Q's Mall (formerly COCOE), the place the factory of Kirin Brewery Co., Ltd. used to be.
Access: JR West Amagasaki Station.

Kaohsiung Hanshin Department Store
Kaohsiung, Taiwan

Former store
Kenmin Hyakkaten (former Kumamoto Hanshin)

3-22, Sakuramachi, Chūō-ku, Kumamoto, see Kumamoto Bus Terminal

On February 23, 2011, Kumamoto Hanshin was renamed . The store was closed on February 28, 2015, due to the redevelopment of Kumamoto Bus Terminal.

Sannomiya

See also
Hankyu Department Store - one of two names of the department stores owned by Hankyu Hanshin Department Stores, Inc.

References

External links 
 H2O Retailing Corporation
  Hankyu Hanshin Department Stores, Inc. (corporate information)
  Hanshin Department Store (event guide and department store information)
  Kenmin Hyakkaten Company (Kumamoto Hanshin)
  Diamor Osaka

Department stores of Japan
Companies based in Osaka Prefecture